Edward Bourchier Hartopp (1808–1884), was a British politician. He was High Sheriff of Leicestershire. He was the Conservative MP for North Leicestershire 1859–68.

Hartopp was born 14 December 1808, the son of Edward Hartopp and Anna Eleanora Wrey. He was educated at Eton and Christchurch, Oxford. In 1833 he was made High Sheriff of Leicestershire and was MP for North Leicestershire from 1859 - 1868. In 1834 he married Honoria Gent the daughter of Major-General William Gent. He owned the parishes of Burton Lazars, Scraptoft and Little Dalby.

He died 31 December 1884 at his residence at 21 Thurloe Square in London. His son, William Hartopp, was a first-class cricketer.

References

1808 births
1884 deaths
Conservative Party (UK) MPs for English constituencies
UK MPs 1859–1865
UK MPs 1865–1868
High Sheriffs of Leicestershire
People educated at Eton College
Alumni of Christ Church, Oxford